The red-legged kittiwake (Rissa brevirostris) is a seabird species in the gull family Laridae. It breeds in the Pribilof Islands, Bogoslof Island and Buldir Island in the Bering Sea off the coast of Alaska, and the Commander Islands, Russia and spends the winter at sea.

Description

The red-legged kittiwake is a very localised subarctic Pacific species. Apart from the distinguishing feature implicit in its name, it is very similar to its better known relative, the black-legged kittiwake; other differences include the shorter bill, larger eyes, a larger, rounder head and darker grey wings, and in the juveniles, which barely differ from the adults, lacking the black tail band and 'W' across the wings of juvenile black-legged kittiwakes. Juveniles take three years to reach maturity.

Like the Pacific race of black-legged kittiwake, the red-legged kittiwake has a well-developed hind toe. As occasional individual black-legged kittiwakes have reddish legs, any reports of red-legged away from the subarctic Pacific must record all of the other differences, not just the leg colour, for acceptance by bird recording authorities.

Behavior
The red-legged kittiwake feeds on fish such as lanternfish (Myctophidae), squid and invertebrates. It spends the summer at the cliff breeding colonies, nesting on ledges, and migrates out to sea in September to overwinter in the north western Pacific Ocean and the Gulf of Alaska.

Status
This species is listed as "Vulnerable" by the IUCN as its population appears to be in decline. Its numbers are thought to have decreased by about 35% between the mid-1970s and the mid-1990s though numbers may have stabilized since. It is unclear why they have declined, but it may be related to a change in the availability of prey, possibly associated excessive commercial fishing or with climate change.

Gallery

References

 Harrison, Peter (1988). Seabirds: An Identification Guide. London: Christopher Helm. 
 Malling Olsen, Klaus and Hans Larsson, Gulls of Europe, Asia and North America 

Birds of the Arctic
Native birds of Alaska
Birds of the Aleutian Islands
red-legged kittiwake
red-legged kittiwake
Kittiwakes
Endemic fauna of Alaska